Pascal Naftali Kondaponi (born 16 December 1980 in Lagos) is a Nigerian football striker.

Clubs 
2012 Sheikh russel Bangladesh premier league
2009 Qingdao
2008/09 Ljungskile SK
as of 
2007/08 C.D. Aves
2006/07 Portimonense S.C.
2005/06 Bnei Sakhnin F.C. / Vitória F.C.
2004/05 F.C. Penafiel
2003/04 Vitória F.C.
2002/03 Vitória F.C. / Nacional
2001/02 Nacional
2000/01 S.C. Freamunde / Puebla F.C.

References

External links

1980 births
Living people
Nigerian footballers
Nigerian expatriate footballers
Hausa people
Vitória F.C. players
Expatriate footballers in Portugal
Primeira Liga players
Bnei Sakhnin F.C. players
Expatriate footballers in Israel
F.C. Penafiel players
Association football forwards
S.C. Freamunde players
C.D. Nacional players
Portimonense S.C. players
Liga MX players
Club Puebla players
Cypriot First Division players
Ayia Napa FC players
Expatriate footballers in Cyprus
Sportspeople from Lagos
Expatriate footballers in Sweden
C.D. Aves players
Expatriate footballers in Angola
Qingdao Hainiu F.C. (1990) players
Chinese Super League players
Expatriate footballers in China
Expatriate footballers in Mexico
Allsvenskan players
Ljungskile SK players